James Nicholas Callis (born 4 June 1971) is a British actor. He is known for playing Dr. Gaius Baltar in the re-imagined Battlestar Galactica miniseries and television series, and Bridget Jones's best friend Tom in Bridget Jones's Diary, Bridget Jones: The Edge of Reason, and Bridget Jones's Baby. He joined the cast of the TV series Eureka, on Syfy, in 2010, and in 2017, he voiced the character Alucard on the Netflix series Castlevania, based on the video game series of the same name. In 2022, he appeared in Season 2 of Star Trek: Picard as Jean-Luc’s father in childhood flashbacks.

Early life
Callis was born in Hampstead and brought up in London, where he attended St. Martin's Prep School in Northwood and then Harrow School in north-west London. His parents owned a bed-and-breakfast. He is of Russian, Polish and Jewish Ukrainian descent. Callis attended the University of York, graduating in 1993 with a BA in English and Related Literature. He was a member of Derwent College, for which he was an enthusiastic rugby player. At university he was also a keen student actor, director and writer. He was a key member of the University of York Gilbert and Sullivan society and appeared in productions put on by friends at Cambridge University, including a production of Harold Pinter's The Dumb Waiter. After graduating from university, Callis trained at LAMDA.

Career

Callis went on to attend the London Academy of Music and Dramatic Art, from which he graduated in 1996. In the same year, he was awarded the Jack Tinker Award (Theatre Record Critic of the Year) for Most Promising Newcomer for his performance in Old Wicked Songs, a two-hander by Jon Marans, in which he starred alongside Bob Hoskins.

Callis has appeared in various West End productions and television series as well as on radio. He has also been involved in writing and directing. His directorial debut was Beginner's Luck, a co-production of his and writer/director Nick Cohen's Late Night Pictures and Angel Eye Film & TV, starring Julie Delpy, Steven Berkoff and Fenella Fielding. Beginner's Luck was critically panned, but ran for almost three weeks on one print (all the low-budget film could afford) in one cinema in central London, then went on a tour of student cinemas around the UK The UK distributor was Guerrilla Films. The film is still on the Icon Catalogue.

Callis finished filming his first role in a cinema film, Bridget Jones's Diary, alongside Renée Zellweger and Hugh Grant, in the summer of 2000 and between a few further film and TV roles went back on stage in the Soho Theatre in December 2002.

In 2003, Callis played the role of Dr. Gaius Baltar in the re-imagined Battlestar Galactica miniseries and continued the role in the regular series that followed. In 2006, Callis won the Best Supporting Actor Saturn Award and an AFI award for his performance as Baltar.

Personal life 
Callis has two sisters. He married on 30 December 1998 and has two sons and a daughter, born 2003, 2005, and 2009.

Filmography

Film

Television

Radio

Web

References

External links

 
 

1971 births
Living people
20th-century English male actors
21st-century English male actors
Alumni of the London Academy of Music and Dramatic Art
Alumni of the University of York
English male film actors
English male television actors
English male voice actors
English people of Polish descent
English people of Russian descent
Male actors from London
People educated at Harrow School
People from Hampstead